Roscoe Robinson (born May 22, 1928, Dermott, Arkansas, United States) is an American gospel and soul singer.

Biography
Robinson recorded as a gospel solo artist in the 1950s with Trumpet Records, and sang in groups such as the Five Trumpets, Highway QCs, and The Fairfield Four. He began recording secular soul in the 1960s, and had two charting hits: "That's Enough" (U.S. No 62, U.S. R&B No. 7) in 1966, and "Do It Right Now" (U.S. R&B No. 40) in 1967.

Robinson began recording again as a gospel artist in the 1980s, releasing solo albums as well as performing with The Blind Boys of Mississippi, though he is not himself blind. He recorded into the 2000s, releasing the albums So Called Friends in 2003, and Gospel Stroll in 2005.

References

External links
Roscoe Robinson Celebrates 90th Birthday With New Release

1928 births
Living people
American soul singers
American male singers
American gospel singers
Singers from Arkansas
American funk musical groups
American dance music groups
Wand Records artists